Minuscule 555 (in the Gregory-Aland numbering), ε 519 (in the Soden numbering), is a Greek minuscule manuscript of the New Testament, on a paper. Palaeographically it has been assigned to the 15th century. 
Scrivener labelled it by number 609.

Description 

The codex contains a complete text of the four Gospels on 185 paper leaves (size ). The writing is in one column per page, 19-25 lines per page.

Text 

The Greek text of the codex Aland did not place in any Category.
According to the Claremont Profile Method in Luke 1; 10; and 20 it belongs to the group 1216 and creates a pair with 152.

History 

Currently the manuscript is housed at the Cambridge University Library (Hh. 6.12) in Cambridge.

The manuscripts was added to the list of the New Testament minuscule manuscripts by F. H. A. Scrivener (609) and C. R. Gregory (555).

See also 

 List of New Testament minuscules
 Biblical manuscript
 Textual criticism

References

Further reading 

 W. H. P. Hatch, Facsimiles and descriptions of minuscule manuscripts of the New Testament (Cambridge, Mass., 1951), XCVIII

Greek New Testament minuscules
15th-century biblical manuscripts